Kodukkur is a village in the vanur taluk of Villupuram district, Tamil Nadu, India.It is near to Pondicherry.

Demographics 

As per the 2001 census, Kodukkur had a total population of 3023 with 1522 males and 1501 females.

References 

Villages in Ariyalur district